The 15th Meril Prothom Alo Awards ceremony, presented by Prothom Alo took place on 26 April 2013, at the Bangabandhu International Conference Center in Dhaka, Bangladesh as a part of the 2012–13 film awards season.

Facts and figures
This was 15th instalment of Meril Prothom Alo Awards. Ghetuputra Komola got the best film awards along with 4 other awards of Critics Choice best director, best film actor, best film actress, and a special award. This was the last directed film of popular novelist Humayun Ahmed. He was awarded as the best film director for this film. Nazmun Munira Nancy got the award in best female singer category for the fourth time in a row from 2009.

Winners and nominations
A total of 14 awards were given at the ceremony. Following is the list of the winners.

Lifetime Achievement Award – 2013
 Prominent singer Ramkanai Das

Public Choice Awards – 2012

Critics Choice Awards – 2012

Special Awards – 2012
 Mamun for Ghetuputra Komola and Meghla for Uttarer Sur

Host and Jury Board
This program was anchored initially by Rumana Malik Munmun. Chanchal Chowdhury and Mosharraf Karim later host the event. The members of Jury Board for television critics were Mamunur Rashid, Tariq Anam Khan, Wahida Mollick Jolly, Zahidur Rahman Anjan and Gaosul Alam Shaon.

Presenters and performers

Presenters

Performers

See also
 National Film Awards (Bangladesh)
 Ifad Film Club Award
 Babisas Award

References

External links

Meril-Prothom Alo Awards ceremonies
2012 film awards
2013 awards in Bangladesh
2013 in Dhaka
April 2013 events in Bangladesh